Diplostethus carolinensis is a species of click beetle in the family Elateridae, found in the southeastern United States.

References

External links

 

Elaterinae
Beetles described in 1916
Beetles of the United States